Madhuban is a small area of Jorhat City and is under Jorhat municipality Board, Assam, India. The only road that passes through Madhubon is the Madhuban Path. It connects two important roads of Jorhat; Malow Ali and Choladhara road. Madhuban is about 1.5 km far from the ASTC Bus Station, Jorhat and Jorhat Court.

Famous Temple

Shitalanatha Temple

This temple is dedicated to Shitalanatha, tenth tirthankar of Jainism.

Padmaprabha Temple

This temple is dedicated to Padmaprabha, sixth tirthankar of Jainism. Moolnayak of this temple is a black colored idol of Padmaprabha

Brahma Kumaris
Madhuban can also refer to the Brahma Kumaris ashram in Mount Abu, Rajasthan. Located in the Araveli mountains is the hill station of Mount Abu, the home of the international headquarters of the Brahma Kumaris, called 'Madhuban' (meaning forest of honey).

Jorhat